Dänew 
() is a city and capital of Dänew District in Lebap Province, Turkmenistan. It received the status of urban-type settlement in 1935. Prior to 2001, it was named Dänew; from 2001 until 2017 the city was named Galkynyş.

Etymology
The name Dänew is Persian or Tajik in origin, derived from deh ("village") and nov ("new"), meaning "new village". The word galkynyş means "revival, renewal" in Turkmen and is sometimes translated as "renaissance".

References

Populated places in Lebap Region